Richard Mortimer Chitwood (February 1, 1878 – November 21, 1926) was an American politician. He served as a Democratic member for the 117th and 121st district of the Texas House of Representatives.

Born in Alabama, Chitwood attended at the Morgan Park Academy. In 1921, he was elected for the 121st district of the Texas House of Representatives. Chitwood succeeded John J. Ford, and was succeeded by Sam A. Bryant in 1923. In the same year, Chitwood was elected for the 117th district of the Texas House of Representatives, succeeding Walter F. Jones. In 1925, Chitwood left office and there was a special election in January 1926, in which J. C. Hall was elected to finish Chitwood's term for the 117th district.

Chitwood lived in Lubbock, Texas, where he was the business manager at the Texas Tech University. He died in November 1926 of angina in Dallas, Texas, at the age of 48, and was buried in Sweetwater Cemetery.

References 

1878 births
1926 deaths
People from Alabama
People from Lubbock, Texas
People from Chicago
People from Nolan County, Texas
Democratic Party members of the Texas House of Representatives
20th-century American politicians
Burials in Texas
Morgan Park Academy alumni
Deaths from angina pectoris